Living with the Law may refer to:

 Living with the Law (album), a 1991 album by Chris Whitley
 "Living with the Law" (song), the title song from the album